Robert Louis McGarity (July 22, 1917 – August 28, 1971) was an American jazz trombonist who was a member of the Benny Goodman big band during the late 1930s and early 1940s. After serving in the military, he was a studio musician in New York City who performed in clubs at night with Eddie Condon and the Lawson/Haggard band. He was member of the World's Greatest Jazz Band at the end of the 1960s.

Discography

As leader
 Music from Some Like it Hot (Jubille, 1957)
 Blue Lou (Argo, 1960)

As sideman
With Kenny Davern
 A Night With Eddie Condon (Arbors)

With Benny Goodman
Peggy Lee & Benny Goodman: The Complete Recordings (Columbia)

With Urbie Green
 All About Urbie Green and His Big Band (ABC-Paramount, 1956)

With Bobby Hackett
 Creole Cookin' (Verve, 1967)

With J. J. Johnson
 J.J.'s Broadway (Verve, 1963)

With Jimmy McPartland
 The Music Man Goes Dixieland (Epic)

With Charlie Parker
 Big Band (Clef, 1954)

With the World's Greatest Jazz Band
 The World's Greatest Jazz Band Volume II (Douglass)

With Cootie Williams
 Cootie Williams in Hi-Fi (RCA Victor, 1958)

References

External links
 Lou McGarity recordings at the Discography of American Historical Recordings.

1917 births
1971 deaths
20th-century American musicians
20th-century American male musicians
20th-century trombonists
American jazz trombonists
Jubilee Records artists
American male jazz musicians
Male trombonists